Scopula technessa is a moth of the  family Geometridae. It is found in Kenya. It was first described by Prout in 1932.

References

Endemic moths of Kenya
Moths described in 1932
Taxa named by Louis Beethoven Prout
technessa
Moths of Africa